Roberto Antonio Pérez Herrera (born March 8, 1956), known professionally as Rubby Perez is a Dominican merengue singer.

Biography
Perez, who aspired to be a baseball player in his youth, turned to music when a car accident caused permanent damage to his left leg. After studying music at the National Conservatory of Santo Domingo, he took his first steps as a member of school groups: Choir Youth Guidance Society, The Youth of Bani in 1978 and Los Hijos del Rey. Perez then entered Wilfrido Vargas' orchestra during the early years of the 1980s (1982-1986), where he had the honor to popularize hits like "El Africano", "Volveré", "Cuando estés con él", and "Cobarde cobarde" among others.

His foray as a solo artist in 1987 brought him hits such as "Buscando tus besos", "Dame veneno", "Enamorado de ella", "Hazme olvidarla", "Sobreviviré", "Tú vas a volar", "Hipocresía", "El perro ajeno", "Así no te amarán jamás", and "Tonto corazón" among others. He's also had two hits in the Billboard charts. His self-titled album "Rubby Perez" spent two weeks at the Tropical list, peaking at number fifteen, and his song "Love her" was #29 on the Latin Charts.

He has won awards such as the Casandra Awards, where it won in the categories of "Orchestra of the Year" and "Merengue of the Year". In Venezuela he won gold and platinum albums in 1988 with his first solo album. He also received Globo awards for "Best Song" and "Album of the Year".

Philanthropy
Rubby Perez was recognized by the Committee of Latin American Political Parties in the United States (COPOLA USA) for his assistance to victims of the earthquake that struck Haiti in 2010.

Discography
 Buscando Tus Besos (1987)
 Fiesta Para Dos! (1988)
 Simplemente Amor (1990)
 Ojos (1992)
 Amores Extraños (1995)
 No Te Olvides (1998)
 Vuelve el Merengue (1999)
 Volando Alto (2001)
 El Cantante (2002)
 Tonto Corazón (2004)
 Dulce Veneno (2007)
 Genial (2010)

References

External links
 Rubby Pérez website

20th-century Dominican Republic male singers
Dominican Republic songwriters
Merengue musicians
Latin music musicians
Latin music songwriters
Living people
1956 births